The 2006–07 Second and Third Division Knock-Out (known as quick Keno Second and Third Division Knock-Out for sponsorship reasons) was a knockout tournament for Maltese football clubs playing in the Second and Third Division.

The 30 participating teams were divided into eight groups, six having four teams each and the remaining two having three. The winning team from each group progressed to a direct elimination round.

Group stage

Group 1

Group 2

Group 3

Group 4

Group 5

Group 6

Group 7

Group 8

Knockout phase

See also 
 2006–07 Maltese Second Division
 2006–07 Maltese Third Division

Maltese Second and Third Division Knock-Out
knock-out